Karen Mowat (c. 16301675) was a Norwegian noblewoman, an heiress, and landowner of Scottish origins.

Biography 
Probably born in Tysnes in present-day Hordaland, Karen Mowat was the daughter of Admiral Axel Mowat (15921661) and Karen Knudsdatter  (died 1662). Her father was the largest landowner in Western Norway. Following the death of her two brothers, she became sole heir to her parents' estate.

While her father was sceptical, Karen Mowat married Ludvig Rosenkrantz: a poor but highborn nobleman from Denmark. While Ludvig wanted to settle in Copenhagen, Karen had her will, establishing Rosendal in Kvinnherad in Hordaland as the family's main residence. They had four sons and five daughters including Justine Cathrine Rosenkrantz (1659–1746) who was a lady-in-waiting to Charlotte Amalie of Hesse-Kassel, queen consort of King Christian V of Denmark . 

In 1678, Ludvig Rosenkrantz was created Baron of Rosendal.

References

Related reading
Jorn Oyrehagen Sunde  (2009)	 From a Shetland Lairdship to a Norwegian Barony: The Mouat Family and the Barony of Rosendal  (Shetland Heritage Publications)

External links
Baroniet Rosendal website

1630 births
1675 deaths
People from Tysnes
Norwegian landowners
17th-century Norwegian nobility
17th-century women landowners